Claude-France Arnould (born 14 August 1953) is a French diplomat. She was Chief Executive of the European Defence Agency from 17 January 2011 until 31 January 2015. She was Ambassador of France to Belgium from October 2015 to April 2019.

Honors 
 Officer of the Legion of Honour
 Officer of the National Order of Merit
 Officer of the Order of Merit of the Federal Republic of Germany
 Officer of the Spanish Crosses of Military Merit (Grand cross)

References

1953 births
Living people
Officiers of the Légion d'honneur
Officers of the Ordre national du Mérite
Officers Crosses of the Order of Merit of the Federal Republic of Germany
Ambassadors of France to Belgium
French women ambassadors